Vladimir Petrović (Serbian Cyrillic: Владимир Петровић; born 1978) is the former Serbian ambassador to the United States.

See also 
 Serbia – United States relations

References 

Living people
Serbia–United States relations
Ambassadors of Serbia to the United States
1978 births